The 2019 Hungarian Challenger Open was a professional tennis tournament played on indoor hard courts. It was the fourth edition of the tournament and was a part of the 2019 ATP Challenger Tour. It took place in Budapest, Hungary between 4 and 10 February 2019.

Singles main-draw entrants

Seeds

 1 Rankings are as of January 28, 2019.

Other entrants
The following players received wildcards into the singles main draw:
  Gábor Borsos
  Alex Molčan
  Péter Nagy
  Zsombor Piros

The following player received entry into the singles main draw as a special exempt:
  Grégoire Barrère

The following player received entry into the singles main draw using a protected ranking:
  Michał Przysiężny

The following players received entry into the singles main draw as alternates:
  Sadio Doumbia
  Hugo Grenier

The following players received entry into the singles main draw using their ITF World Tennis Ranking:
  Baptiste Crepatte
  Peter Heller
  Aslan Karatsev
  Fabien Reboul

The following players received entry from the qualifying draw:
  Steven Diez
  Dávid Szintai

The following player received entry as a lucky loser:
  Alessandro Bega

Champions

Singles

 Alexander Bublik def.  Roberto Marcora 6–0, 6–3.

Doubles

 Kevin Krawietz /  Filip Polášek def.  Filippo Baldi /  Luca Margaroli 7–5, 7–6(7–5).

2019 ATP Challenger Tour
2019 in Hungarian tennis
February 2019 sports events in Europe